Engiadiana is a World Cup ski course in Switzerland at St. Moritz, Grisons,   located in the Engadin valley on Piz Nair mountain in the Albula Alps.

It is adjacent to the older and more famous men's "Corviglia" speed events course, which hosted the Winter Olympics in 1948 and several World Championships.

World Championships

Men's events

Women's events

World Cup

Women
Unclear if 1999, 2000 and 2001 events were held on Corviglia or Engiadina course?

Full course sections
Britain station start (at "Free Fall" bottom), Fashion Alpina, Super-G start, Foppa, Gianda, Großes Loch, Weißes Band, Reinaltersprung, Engnis, Lärchenweg, Salastrains (finish area).

References

External links

FIS Alpine Ski World Cup – St. Moritz, Switzerland
Ski-db.com - St. Moritz women's races

Skiing in Switzerland